Gary Smikle (born 26 April 1966) is a Jamaican boxer. He competed in the men's light middleweight event at the 1988 Summer Olympics.

References

External links
 

1966 births
Living people
Light-middleweight boxers
Jamaican male boxers
Olympic boxers of Jamaica
Boxers at the 1988 Summer Olympics
Boxers at the 1987 Pan American Games
Pan American Games bronze medalists for Jamaica
Pan American Games medalists in boxing
Place of birth missing (living people)
Medalists at the 1987 Pan American Games
20th-century Jamaican people
21st-century Jamaican people